Washington Ellsworth Lindsey (December 20, 1862 – April 5, 1926) was an American politician and the third governor of New Mexico.

Biography 
Lindsey was born near Armstrongs Mills, Ohio on December 20, 1862. He was the son of Robert Washington and Julia Anne (Shipman) Lindsey. He graduated from Scio College in 1884. He then worked as a teacher in Ohio, New York, and Illinois. He attended the University of Michigan and completed his LL.B. degree in 1891.

Lindsey practiced law for ten years in Chicago, Illinois before moving to Portales, New Mexico. He was a Republican and served as United States Commissioner in 1900, County Clerk of Roosevelt County from 1903 to 1905, Assistant District Attorney in Roosevelt County from 1905 to 1909, Mayor of Portales from 1909 to 1910 and a Member of the State Constitutional Convention from 1910 to 1912. He was elected lieutenant governor of New Mexico in 1916.

Governor Ezequiel C. de Baca died in office on February 18, 1917. Lindsey, who was the lieutenant governor, assumed the duties of the governorship. During Lindsey's term in office, First World War measures were initiated, the 'Australian ballot' system was promoted and a corrupt practices bill was lobbied for. Lindsey left office on January 1, 1919.

After serving as governor, Lindsey resumed his private career, primarily working as an attorney. In 1924 he served as a delegate to the Republican National Convention, at which Calvin Coolidge received the party's nomination as presidential candidate.

Lindsey died in Portales, New Mexico on April 5, 1926. He is buried in Portales Cemetery.

References

Further reading 
 Sobel, Robert and John Raimo. Biographical Directory of the Governors of the United States, 1789-1978. Greenwood Press, 1988. 

1862 births
1926 deaths
American Congregationalists
Republican Party governors of New Mexico
People from Allen County, Ohio
University of Michigan Law School alumni
People from Portales, New Mexico